Rodrigo Francisco Pinto Vieira Fernandes (born 23 March 2001) is a Portuguese professional footballer who plays as a midfielder for FC Porto B.

Football career
Fernandes was born in Lisbon and formed exclusively at his hometown's Sporting CP. He made his professional debut on 27 October 2019 in a 3–1 Primeira Liga home win over Vitória de Guimarães, playing the final two minutes as a substitute for Eduardo Henrique.

References

External links

2001 births
Living people
Footballers from Lisbon
Portuguese footballers
Portugal youth international footballers
FC Porto B players
Sporting CP footballers
Sporting CP B players
Primeira Liga players
Campeonato de Portugal (league) players
Association football forwards